Cistus osbeckiifolius is a shrubby species of flowering plant in the family Cistaceae, with pink to purple flowers.

Description
Its three-nerved leaves are narrow, lanceolate to elliptical in shape, and slightly pointed at the apex. They are densely covered with simple hairs. The stigma is longer than the stamens. The fruiting capsules are brown and covered with hairs.

Taxonomy and phylogeny
Cistus osbeckiifolius was formally named in 1887 (the epithet was originally spelt osbeckiaefolius). Philip Webb collected in the Canary Islands in 1828–1830. Although he gave this species a name and wrote a description, it was not published in his lifetime (he died in 1854). In 1887, Heinrich Christ published Webb's description, along with those of other plants in Webb's herbarium. The epithet osbeckiifolius means "with leaves like Osbeckia".

A subspecies, C. osbeckiifolius subsp. tomentosus Bañares & Demoly, has been recognized (hence creating the nominate subspecies, C. osbeckiifolius subsp. osbeckiifolius), although  The Plant List does not accept this taxon.

A 2011 molecular phylogenetic study placed C. osbeckiifolius as a member of the purple and pink flowered clade (PPC) of Cistus species, along with other Canary Island endemics.

Distribution and habitat
Cistus osbeckiifolius is endemic to Tenerife in the Canary Islands. It is found at elevations of  around Mount Teide, particularly in the region known as Las Cañadas. The climate is relatively dry and temperate to cold.

Conservation
Cistus osbeckiifolius (as the subspecies osbeckiifolius) has been rated as "endangered" (EN) in the Spanish "Red List" (Libro Rojo de la Flora Vascular Amenazada de España). The species is considered at risk for several reasons: a limited area of distribution, restricted genetic diversity in all but one subpopulation, grazing by rabbits, the effects of fire, and human disturbance. In 2007 a fire destroyed one complete subpopulation.

References

osbeckiifolius
Plants described in 1887
Flora of the Canary Islands